Kanekonia is a genus of marine ray-finned fish, velvetfishes belonging to the family Aploactinidae. The genus is found in the western Pacific and eastern Indian oceans.

Taxonomy
Kanekonia was originally described as a genus in 1915 by the Japanese ichthyologist Shigeho Tanaka when he was describing the new species Kanekonia florida from Japan, its type species by monotypy. The genus Kanekonia is classified within the family Aploactinidae in the suborder Scorpaenoidei within the order Scorpaeniformes, although this family is also treated as a subfamily of the stonefish family Synanceiidae within the Scorpaenoidei, which in turn is treated as a superfamily within the order Perciformes. The name of the genus, Kanekonia honours Ichiro Kaneko, who supplied Tanaka with fishes from a fish market in Nagasaki, Japan, including the holotype of K. florida.

Species
There are currently four recognized species in this genus:
 Kanekonia florida S. Tanaka, 1915
 Kanekonia leichhardti J. W. Johnson, 2013 (Leichhardt's Velvetfish)
 Kanekonia pelta Poss, 1982
 Kanekonia queenslandica Whitley, 1952 (Deep velvetfish)

Characteristics
Kanekonia velvetfishes are characterised by having a short, deep body with an extremely large head and mouth, with a protruding lower jaw. The preoperculum has 5 blunt spines. The scales take the form of outwardly directed spines, similar to tiny papillae with those on the back and flanks being the largest. They have a continuous dorsal fin which has its origin above the rear part of the eye The spiny part of  this fin is longer than the soft-rayed part. The fin spines do not have venom glands.

Distribution and habitat
Kanekonia velvetfishes are found in the eastern Indian and western Pacific Oceans. These fishes are demersal and are found mainly on sandy substrates.

References

Aploactinidae
Taxa named by Shigeho Tanaka